The 11th Infantry Regiment is an infantry regiment of the Hellenic Army. It was founded in March 1897 in Larissa as part of the 2nd Infantry Division's 4th Brigade. With the Army reorganization of 1912, it was subordinated to the 4th Infantry Division, where it has remained since. The regiment distinguished itself in the Asia Minor Campaign, earning the highest Greek decoration for valour, the Commander's Cross of the Cross of Valour. The regiment was disbanded on 2 May 1941, following the Greek army's capitulation after the German invasion of Greece, and was reconstituted in 1945 as a recruit training center. In 1965 it was moved to Tripoli, which has been its base since.

References 

1897 establishments in Greece
Infantry regiments of Greece
Tripoli, Greece
Commander's Crosses of the Cross of Valour (Greece)
Military units and formations of Greece in World War II
Military units and formations of Greece in the Greco-Turkish War (1919–1922)
Military units and formations of Greece in the Balkan Wars
Military units and formations established in 1897